Senator Miles may refer to:

Borris Miles (born 1965), Texas State Senate
Frederick Miles (1815–1896), Connecticut State Senate
Kathy Miles (born 1950), South Dakota State Senate
Steen Miles (1946–2017), Georgia State Senate
Willard W. Miles (1845–1926), Vermont State Senate

See also
Vicki Miles-LaGrange (born 1953), Oklahoma State Senate